Kim Duk-young (Hangul: 김덕영; born 12 September 1991) is a South Korean badminton player. Together with Jun Bong-chan, he won the 2015 Thailand International Challenge tournament after beat Indonesian pair in the final. He also won the 2015 Osaka International tournament in the mixed doubles event partnered with Eom Hye-won. Kim helped the Korean national team compete at the 2017 Sudirman Cup and won that tournament.

Achievements

BWF International Challenge/Series (4 titles, 1 runner-up) 
Men's doubles

Mixed doubles

  BWF International Challenge tournament
  BWF International Series tournament
  BWF Future Series tournament

References

External links 
 

1991 births
Living people
Sportspeople from South Jeolla Province
South Korean male badminton players